There are four groups in the Asia/Oceania Zone of the Davis Cup. The two winners of Group I advances to the World Group play-offs while the last placed team will be relegated to Group II the following year. The winner of Group II gets promoted to Group I next year, the two last placed teams get relegated to Group III. The top two teams of Group III gets promoted to Group II while the two weakest teams gets relegated to Group IV. In Group IV no team can get relegated, the best two will get promoted to Group III.

Group I

Draw

Group II

Draw

Group III

Group IV

References

External links
Official Site

 
Davis Cup Asia/Oceania Zone
2011 Davis Cup